Mahrokhi Kalleh Jub (also Romanized as Māhrokhī Kalleh Jūb) is a village in Beyranvand-e Jonubi Rural District, Bayravand District, Khorramabad County, Lorestan Province, Iran. At the 2006 census, its population was 15, in 5 families.

References 

Towns and villages in Khorramabad County